Tara N. Palmore is an American physician-scientist and epidemiologist specializing in patient safety through prevention of hospital-acquired infections. As of 2021 she was the hospital epidemiologist at George Washington University School of Medicine and Health Sciences.

Education 
Palmore earned an undergraduate degree from Harvard College and a M.D. from the University of Virginia School of Medicine. She completed her internship and residency in internal medicine at the NewYork-Presbyterian Hospital/Cornell Internal Medicine Residency Program and her fellowship in infectious diseases at the NIH's National Institute of Allergy and Infectious Diseases (NIAID) fellowship program.

Career 
In 2005, Palmore began her career at the NIH as a staff clinician in the NIAID laboratory of clinical infectious diseases. She became deputy hospital epidemiologist in the NIH Clinical Center in 2007 and became hospital epidemiologist in 2014. As hospital epidemiologist, Palmore aims to optimize patient safety through prevention of hospital-acquired infections. In 2021, she became a Professor of Medicine in the Division of Infectious Diseases and Hospital Epidemiologist at George Washington University School of Medicine and Health Sciences

Selected works

References 

Living people
Year of birth missing (living people)
Place of birth missing (living people)
Harvard College alumni
University of Virginia School of Medicine alumni
National Institutes of Health people
21st-century American women physicians
21st-century American physicians
21st-century American women scientists
American women epidemiologists
American epidemiologists
George Washington University School of Medicine & Health Sciences faculty